List of National Lacrosse League seasons since the league's inception:

Eagle Pro Box Lacrosse League
1987 |
1988

Major Indoor Lacrosse League
1989 |
1990 | 
1991 | 
1992 | 
1993 | 
1994 | 
1995 | 
1996 | 
1997

National Lacrosse League 
1998 | 
1999 |
2000 | 
2001 | 
2002 | 
2003 | 
2004 | 
2005 |
2006 |
2007 |
2008 |
2009 |
2010 |
2011 |
2012 |
2013 |
2014 |
2015 |
2016 |
2017 |
2018 |
2019 |
2020 |
 |
2022 |